The Paranaque shootout was a deadly confrontation between members of the Philippine National Police, the Special Action Force and the Waray-Ozamis Gang on December 5, 2008 in Parañaque, Metro Manila. The shootout became controversial due to the death of two civilians including a 7-year-old girl in the cross-fire. Director Leopoldo Bataoil, chief of the National Capital Region Police Office (NCRPO), described the shootout as the bloodiest firefight between lawmen and criminal elements in Metro Manila.

Background
In the 2000s, many cities in Luzon were beset by crimes conducted by various robbery groups, many of whom were of Waray ethnicity. Poverty during President Gloria Macapagal Arroyo's administration caused many in faraway provinces to form or join a gang. Hold-ups were the primary activity, where they would rob cars, buses and trucks in rural roads, as well as banks and stores in urban areas. At that time, they became notorious for their shootouts with the law enforcement, with one gang member proclaiming once how he hated the police during a robbery in Pampanga.

Shootout
In late 2008, the Philippine National Police tracked down one of these robbery hold-up groups known as the "Waray-Ozamis Gang" in Parañaque City. On the night of December 5, the police trailed the gangsters in a crowded subdivision in Sucat. The latter were driving in SUVs and motorcycles when they sensed that they were being followed. After spotting the officers, the gang started to open fire. Law enforcement consisted of the Highway Patrol Group, Special Action Force, National Capital Region Police Office and Southern Police District fired back. Both parties were well-armed, with the gang sporting M16s fitted with underbarrel grenade launchers.

In the gunfight that ensued, the SAF unit managed to kill eight suspects inside a vehicle, while the HPG killed two more armed men on motorcycles. During their escape, the gangsters tried to blow up a diesel tanker to divert the cops' attention. An OFW seaman by the name of Jun De Vera and his daughter Lia, were caught in the crossfire and killed. By the end of the hour-long battle, sixteen people died including ten criminals but many had managed to escape. Barangay tanod Bernard Tuncab died as he was rushed to the hospital.

Aftermath
The PNP was criticized for their role in the deaths of the two civilians since it was determined that the bullets that struck them came from the guns of the SAF. The head of the Internal Affairs Service of the PNP said, "We failed in our mission to protect the civilians. Because during the conduct of operation many civilian lives were lost." On July 29, 2009, it was reported that the Department of Justice (DOJ) had filed multiple murder charges against 29 policemen, including three generals, in connection with the shootout following the filing of a complaint-affidavit by Lilian de Vera, the wife of Jun De Vera. On January 11, 2010, the Commission on Human Rights recommended the filing of criminal and administrative charges against 26 of the policemen.

In March, it was reported that after two witnesses had said De Vera and his daughter were not killed in the shootout, that policemen already had complete control of the area where the two were killed, the Department of Justice filed two counts of murder charges against 25 of the policemen. Eight policemen were eventually arrested for their role in the shootout: Chief Inspector Lawrence Cajipe, Chief Inspector Joel Mendoza, Inspector Gerardo Balacutan, Police Officers 3 Jolito Mamanao Jr. and Fernando Rey Gapuz, Police Officers 2 Eduardo Blanco and Edwin Santos, and PO1 Josil Rey Lucena. Seventeen SAF members were also arrested but exonerated in 2014.

In popular culture
 The shootout was dramatized in an episode of Case Unclosed entitled "The December Shootout".
 The TV 5 series Pulis Pulis aired an episode about the Paranaque shootout.

References 

2008 in the Philippines
Organized crime conflicts in the Philippines
History of Metro Manila
Conflicts in 2008